
Lac des Toules is a reservoir in Valais, Switzerland, at Bourg-Saint-Pierre. It has a €2.2 million floating solar plant that was flown in by helicopter in 2019, and delivers 800 MWh/year.

The dam Les Toules was completed in 1963.

See also
List of lakes of Switzerland
List of mountain lakes of Switzerland

References

Lakes of Valais
Reservoirs in Switzerland